Fornæs Lighthouse in Denmark is located on the eastern tip of the Danish peninsula, Djursland by the sea, Kattegat between Denmark and Sweden, 6 kilometers north of the town Grenaa.

The lighthouse was built in 1839 based on drawings by Georg Holgreen. The tower is integrated with the lighthouse keepers house. The lighthouse is supplied with rotating mirrors. In 1892 the current lighthouse tower was built from granite. In 1902 an acetylene based lamp was installed. In 1924 it was electrified based on British lighthouse technology.

Description

The tower is based on a 3 meter deep and 8.8 meter wide concrete foundation resting on solid lime underground. The 22 meter granite tower is built on a 0.5 meter granite base. The stairs leading up the tower has 84 granite steps, with one end integrated in the outer granite wall of the tower. The woodwork in the tower is made from teak. The cylindrical lamp structure has a diameter of 3.7 meters, and a window height of 2.8 meters supported by 12 window bars made of iron.

In 1976-77 a 365 m² 2-story control center was built next to the lighthouse. From here a number of automated lighthouses were controlled. On January 1, 2000 the control center was closed, and the automated functions where transferred to the Danish capital, Copenhagen.

There is a parking area by the lighthouse giving public access to the beach and coastal fields south and north of the lighthouse. Anglers and divers also visit the area. The lighthouse keepers house has been used as a vacation rental since 2011.

See also

List of lighthouses and lightvessels in Denmark

References

External links 
 Fornæs Fyr Fornæs Fyr website

Grenaa
Lighthouses completed in 1839
Buildings and structures in Norddjurs Municipality
Lighthouses in Denmark